The Guangzhou massacre was a massacre of the inhabitants of the prosperous port city of Guangzhou in 878–879 by the rebel army of Huang Chao. Arab sources indicate that foreign victims, including Muslims, Jews, Christians, and Zoroastrians, numbered in tens of thousands based on Chinese records of prior inhabitants. Two travellers from the Abbasid Caliphate, Abu Zaid al Hassan from Siraf writing decades afterwards, and al-Masudi writing in the 10th century, estimated that 120,000 or 200,000 foreigners were killed respectively, but according to Morris Rossabi, the numbers were inflated.

Background
In the early 870s, drought and famine in Henan led to widespread banditry. In 874, the bandits rebelled under Wang Xianzhi in Changyuan, Henan and ravaged the region between the Changjiang and Yellow River. When Wang died in 878, he was succeeded by Huang Chao, a failed examination candidate from a wealthy salt trading family.

Massacre
In 878 AD after Huang Chao's forces pushed into southern China, they arrived at the gates of Khanfu (Guangzhou). According to the Arab writer Abu Zayd Hasan Ibn Yazid Sirafi, the presence of Muslims, Jews, and Christians came to an end when the Tang rebel, Huang Chao, occupied Khanfu from 878 to 879. In addition, he mentioned the "al-Qazzu" (a mulberry tree) were ruined by Huang Chao's army. The English translation of Abu Zayd's geography book from the original Arabic text by Tim Macintosh Smith shows that the location of the city of Khanfu, such as "the city lies a few days journey from the sea, on a great river where the water flows fresh ... the city is covered with mulberry trees as fodder for silkworms" is quite different from that of Khanfu (Guangzhou).

Shine Toshihiko found that the location of the massacre in 877–878 in Abu Zayd's account was a clerical error and it actually showed that the location of the massacre in 760 AD was in Kanfu (now Yangzhou). He pointed out that there was a confusion between the two massacres in Arab sources (the Kanfu Massacre was in Yangzhou in 760, while the Khanfu Massacre was in 878). Shine also supports the hypothesis of Kuwabara Jitsuzo about the latter Khanfu (Guangzhou) and said that Abu Zayd confused Khanfu with Kanfu. Shine assigns Khanfu to Qinfu (Qinzhou, 600 km west of Guangzhou).

According to the statement of Heguri-no-Hironari, a Japanese envoy to the Tang dynasty in Qinzhou, the city was the mother port of merchants called Shu-Kunlun who rescued Hironari and others who were drifted in Lin-yi in 753.

See also
 Yangzhou massacre
 List of massacres in China
 Racism in China
 Xenophobia

References

Bibliography

 

870s conflicts
9th century in China
9th-century massacres
Battles involving the Tang dynasty
History of Guangzhou
Massacres in China
War crimes in China
Violence against Muslims
878
879
Massacres of Muslims